Gav Kosh may refer to:

 Gav Kosh-e Olya
 Gav Kosh-e Sofla
 Gav Kosh-e Vosta

See also
 Gavkosh (disambiguation)